The following is a list of theatres in Albania.

Theatres

See also 
 Lists of theatres

References 

 
Albania
Theatres